Budennovsky is a rural locality (a village) in Baltiysky Selsoviet, Iglinsky District, Bashkortostan, Russia. The population was 192 as of 2010. There are 5 streets.

Geography 
Budennovsky is located 23 km southeast of Iglino (the district's administrative centre) by road. Baltika is the nearest rural locality.

References 

Rural localities in Iglinsky District